Little Trees are disposable air fresheners shaped like a stylized evergreen tree, marketed for use in motor vehicles, and most commonly seen hanging from rear-view mirrors. They are made of a specially formulated absorbent material produced in a variety of colors and scents.

Little Trees were invented in 1952 in Watertown, New York, by Julius Sämann, a German-Jewish chemist and businessman who had fled the Nazis. He had studied Alpine tree aromas in the forests of Canada and was interested in the biological mechanisms used to transport and disseminate them. Little Trees air fresheners are manufactured in the United States by the Car-Freshner Corporation at factories (such as Royal Pine) in Watertown, New York and DeWitt, Iowa. Several companies in Europe produce Little Trees under license from Julius Sämann Ltd. using the names Wunder-Baum (in Austria, Switzerland, Denmark, Finland, Germany, Norway, Poland, Romania, Slovenia, Hungary and Sweden) and  Arbre Magique (in France, Belgium, the Netherlands, Italy, Portugal, and Spain). It was formerly known as Magic Tree in the United Kingdom until the "Little Tree" name was adopted in 2011. The company is known for pursuing lawsuits to protect its trademark.

Trademark 
Car-Freshner fiercely defends its trademark of the tree-shaped air freshener design, and has filed several lawsuits against makers of lookalike products and against companies that use their products in other commercial media.

In 2002, Car-Freshner sued Rite Way Wholesale and Distributors, Inc. of New York for importing and distributing a "vanilla-scented tree shaped air fresheners with a patriotic design". As a result of the judgement, the defendants were required to surrender their entire inventory to the plaintiffs for destruction, and were required to pay an unspecified penalty.

In 2006, Car-Freshner sued Dale Detwiler (owner of the Austin, Texas-based Corndog Cards & Novelties) after Detwiler company produced holiday greeting cards that bore a glow-in-the-dark image of a scratch-and-sniff tree-shaped air freshener.

In 2006, Car-Freshner won a suit against UK-based Tetrosyl Ltd for producing a tree-shaped air freshener that "included snow, flashing lights, the shape of a tub at the bottom".

In 2009, Car-Freshner sued Getty Images for unauthorized use of its tree-shaped air fresheners in a series of stock photographs.

Julius Sämann Ltd. filed a complaint with the Norwegian Industrial Property Office (NIPO) against Bulgarian air-freshener manufacturer Balev Eood for producing an aircraft-shaped air freshener which was somewhat similar in shape to their trademarked fir tree shape. NIPO rejected the complaint, and the Board of Appeal upheld the decision in January 2011.

In 2011, Car-Freshner sued Beck & Call for producing a similar line of tree-shaped promotional air fresheners.

In December 2015, Car-Freshner sued Sun Cedar, a non-profit organization that aimed to provide gainful employment to the homeless and previously incarcerated, for producing tree-shaped air fresheners made of cedar wood. In September 2016, unable to cope with the growing legal costs, Sun Cedar filed for bankruptcy.

In 2018, Car-Freshner sued Balenciaga for making $275 key chains that copy the appearance of the Little Trees air fresheners.

In popular culture
Little Trees have been featured in multiple aspects of popular culture.

Art
The British artist Jack Williams, the son of a car salesman, created ‘‘Forest’’, a 2009 installation using 350 Royal Pine air fresheners, hung in a square configuration from the ceiling via fishing wire.

Films
Little Trees have been featured in such movies as: Repo Man (1984), The Fisher King (1991), Grumpy Old Men (1993), Seven (1995),.  Ocean's Eleven (2001), The Texas Chainsaw Massacre (2003), and Sonic the Hedgehog 2 (film) (2022) and Euphoria (American TV series).

Music
Mike D mentions Little Trees in the Beastie Boys song, "Slow Ride" ("I got the trees in my mirror/So my car won't smell").

Raggare
In Norway, Sweden and Finland, the Wunder-Baum brand is sometimes associated with the raggare subculture.

Legality

In the United States, many states have regulations concerning obstructed view, objects hanging from the rear-view mirror, obstructed windshield, or similar legislation. Citations and/or custodial arrests for violations of such statutes are not unknown.

References

External links
Car-Freshner Corporation @ www.littletrees.com
Little Trees Europe @ www.little-trees.eu

Automotive accessories
American inventions